This is a list of cities and towns in Bahrain with listed governorates:

Ten largest cities 

Manama – 436,000
Riffa – 195,606
Muharraq – 176,583
Hamad Town – 57,000
A'ali – 51,400
Isa Town – 39,800
Sitra – 60,100
Budaiya – 33,230
Jidhafs – 32,600
Al-Malikiyah – 14,800

Other towns
Jid Ali
Sanabis
Tubli
Durrat Al Bahrain
Gudaibiya
Salmabad
Jurdab
Diyar Al Muharraq
Amwaj Islands
Al Hidd
Arad
Busaiteen
Samaheej
Al Dair
Zinj

Northern Governorate

 
Bahrain, List of cities in
Cities
Bahrain

simple:Bahrain#Cities